Ancient Campania (often also identified as Campania Felix or ager Campanus) originally indicated the territory of the ancient city of Capua in the Roman period, and later also the plains of the various neighboring municipalities. It was a very large territory when compared with the other Italic cities of the Roman and pre-Roman period.

It extended from the slopes of Mount Massico (to the north) up to the Phlegraean Fields and the Vesuvian area to the south. Initially it also included the ager Falernus, then it was heavily downsized by Rome due to the alliance of the city of Capua with Hannibal.

The main inhabited centers of this historical region were (from north to south) Capua, Atella, Liternum, Cumae, Baiae, Puteoli, Acerrae, Nola, Neapolis, Caprae, Oplontis, Pompei, Sorrentum, Stabiae, Nuceria Alfaterna and Salernum. Thanks to the fertility of the soil, also due to the presence of the Volturno river, it earned the name of Campania Felix.

Classical age 
According to the Roman philologist Sesto Pompeo Festo (II century BC), the pre-Roman name of Campania was Oscor, the name from which the Osci peoples who lived there (Osci enim a Regione Campaniæ, quae est Oscor, vocati sunt.). The toponym Campania, dating back to the fifth century BC, is of classical origin. The most accredited hypothesis is that it derives from the name of the ancient inhabitants of Capua. From Capuani, in fact, we would have Campani and, therefore, Campania; furthermore, both Livio and Polybius say of an Ager Campanus with a clear reference to Capua and the surrounding area. Ancient Campania, closed between the Apennines and the sea, had the Sele river as its boundaries to the south and the Garigliano to the north (according to Pliny the Elder, however, the city of Sinuessa). The territory of Campania, together with Latium, became part, in the Augustan subdivision, of the Regio I: Latium et Campania.

Middle Ages 
In the Middle Ages, the toponym Terra Laboris, recorded for the first time in 1092 (although there are doubts about the originality of the document), replaced the name Campania. The new toponym will officially replace the old one in the Norman territorial subdivision. In fact, from the seventh century, due to the prevalence of the Duchy of Naples, the connection between the Latin toponym Campania and what it originally indicated was lost in the language: in an emblematic way, the geographical maps, from about 1500 to 1700, show the indication Terra Laboris olim Campania felix.

Bibliography 

 Gennaro Franciosi, La storia dell'Ager Campanus, i problemi della limitatio e sua lettura attuale (Real sito di S. Leucio 8-9 June 2001), Naples, Jovene Editore, 2002, .

References

External links 

 Approfondimento sull'archeologia vesuviana e campana, on vesuviolive.it.

Geographical, historical and cultural regions of Italy
History of Campania
Campania